The following highways are numbered 528:

Canada
Alberta Highway 528
 Ontario Highway 528
 Ontario Highway 528A

United States